Volleyball was contested at the 2013 Summer Universiade from July 8 to 13 in Kazan, Russia.

Medal summary

Medal table

Medal events

Men

Twenty-two teams participated in the men's tournament.

Teams

Pool A
 
 
 
 
 
 

Pool B
 
 
 
  (withdrew)
  (withdrew)
 

Pool C
 
 
 
 
 
 

Pool D

Women

Sixteen teams participated in the women's tournament.

Teams

Pool A
 
 
 
 

Pool B
 
 
 
  (withdrew)

Pool C
 
 
 
 

Pool D

References

External links
 2013 Summer Universiade – Volleyball
Results book

 
2013 in volleyball
2013 Summer Universiade events
Volleyball at the Summer Universiade
Universiade